The 1973 German Formula Three Championship was a multi-event motor racing championship for single-seat open wheel formula racing cars held across Europe. The championship featured drivers competing in two-litre Formula Three racing cars which conformed to the technical regulations, or formula, for the championship. It commenced on 1 April at Nürburgring and ended at Mainz-Finthen on 9 September after five rounds.

Willi Deutsch became a champion. He won three races. Dieter Kern finished as runner-up. Thomas Betzler completed the top-three in the drivers' standings.

Calendar
All rounds were held in West Germany, excepting Zolder round which held in Belgium.

Championship standings
Points are awarded as follows:

References

External links
 

German Formula Three Championship seasons
Formula Three season